Rudolf Wolke (9 June 1906 – 12 March 1979) was a German racing cyclist. He rode in the 1930 Tour de France.

References

External links
 

1906 births
1979 deaths
German male cyclists
Cyclists from Berlin
People from Neukölln